Obediah Timbaci (born 3 June 2003) is a Vanuatuan sprinter who competes in the 400 metres event. Timbaci won bronze as part of the Vanuatu 4 x 400 metres relay team at the 2019 Pacific Games in Samoa. 

Timbaci competed at the 2022 Oceania Athletics Championships, placing 7th. Timbaci also competed at the 2022 World Athletics Championships.

Personal Bests 

 400 metres - 50.49

References

External links 
 

2003 births
Living people
Vanuatuan male sprinters